Ragged Island is one of the Pye Islands on the southern tip of the Kenai Peninsula, Alaska. It is east of Nuka Island, separated by Nuka Bay.

Islands of Alaska
Islands of Kenai Peninsula Borough, Alaska